AusCERT is a non-profit organisation founded in 1993, that provides advice and solutions to cybersecurity threats and vulnerabilities. The organisation covers their costs through member subscriptions, attendees to the annual AusCERT conference and service contracts.

History 
In the early 1990s, Australian university student Nahshon Even-Chai hacked into the NASA computer system during his spare time. This triggered a chain reaction, causing businesses and government bodies to want improved information security. As a result, three Australian universities (Queensland University of Technology, Griffith University, and the University of Queensland) came together to form AusCERT. They aimed to create a central source for information security and protection.

AusCERT is one of Australia’s only Computer Emergency Response Team (CERT) and is one of the oldest CERT in the world. As a FIRST Member, AusCERT is part of a worldwide network of computer security incident response and security teams. These teams work together to voluntarily deal with computer security problems and formulating prevention methods.

Their office is located on The University of Queensland campus.

Services 
AusCERT covers their costs by selling member subscriptions and service contracts to individuals and businesses. The organisation boosts its 24/7 support and incident management against cyber threats. Other services include phishing take-down, security bulletins, incident notifications, sensitive information alerts, early warning SMS, and malicious URL feeds.

Engaged and active within the incident response teams at a global level; AusCERT is a charter member, of APCERT  as well as a member of the Forum of Incident Response Security Team (FIRST).

AusCERT Annual Conference 
AusCERT has been hosting cybersecurity conferences in Australia since 2001. The conference takes place every year with industry professionals and hands-on tutorials. The AusCERT Conference is the oldest information security conference in Australia and was once the biggest conference in the country.

Over the last few years, the conference has attracted approximately 800 participants, 50 sponsors and more than 50 speakers. The three to four-day program generally includes tutorials, keynote speakers, a gala dinner and Australian Information Security Awards, and a speed debate.

In 2020, due to the COVID-19 pandemic, AusCERT hosted their first virtual conference with over a 1000 delegates registering. The conference MC was Adam Spencer and featured speakers Julie Inman (eSafety Commission), Kana Shinoda (Code Blue), and Lukasz Gogolkiewicz (Seek).

Additional Activities 
The organisation currently supports and shares cybersecurity techniques opening with the following groups:

 The Australian Access Federation,
 Cyber Security threat annual surveys with BDO,
 International Training with APNIC,
 Training and support with KrCERT, and 
 Council of Australian University Directors of Information Technology (CAUDIT).

References

External links
  auscert.org.au

Computer security companies
Computer security accreditations